Shaw Boulevard (formerly known as Jose Rizal Boulevard and Pasig Boulevard or commonly known as Crossing) is a 4-8 lane highway connecting the cities of Mandaluyong and Pasig in the Philippines. The boulevard is named after William James Shaw, the founder of the Wack Wack Golf and Country Club in Mandaluyong. The road is one of the major thoroughfares of the Ortigas Center in Mandaluyong and Pasig, housing many shopping malls like the Starmall shopping center and the posh Shangri-La Plaza at the EDSA-Shaw intersection and The Marketplace, which is visible from the Kalentong-Shaw intersection and Sevilla Bridge.

It is served by the Shaw Boulevard station of the MRT-3 along EDSA, often called EDSA-Crossing. The entirety of the road is served by bus and jeepney routes that go to and from Quiapo, Santa Mesa, the José Rizal University, EDSA, Ortigas Center, the Pasig Public Market, and Binangonan, Rizal.

Route description

Shaw Boulevard starts as a four-lane road at Sevilla Bridge, which crosses the San Juan River, before coming to an intersection past General Kalentong Street. It is the physical continuation of P. Sanchez Street in Manila. It follows a slightly curved route over Mandaluyong before crossing EDSA. The road expands into four lanes per direction, with two lanes going to the flyover, and two lanes passing below. The flyover carries the road over Shaw Boulevard MRT Station and descends near EDSA Shangri-la. The road becomes a dual six-lane carriageway east of EDSA, and soon enters Pasig. Shaw Boulevard eventually is reduced to a four-lane road and extends to C-5 as Pasig Boulevard. The entire span of the road and its continuations from Sevilla Bridge to Pasig Boulevard have unprotected, painted one-way bike lanes.

Landmarks

Schools
Lourdes School of Mandaluyong
José Rizal University

Shopping Centers
Ortigas Center
Capitol Commons
Shangri-La Plaza
Crossings Department Store (now Rustan's)
Starmall EDSA Shaw
EDSA Central Mall
SM Cherry Shaw Branch
S&R Membership Shopping Shaw
500 Shaw Zentrum
Super8 Grocery Warehouse Shaw
Puregold Shaw
Shaw Center Mall
Metro Supermarket Shaw Center 
SM Hypermart Mandaluyong 
The Marketplace Shopping Mall

Offices
Worldwide Corporate Center
Acquire BPO
E-Telecare Global Solutions CC7 Shaw Site
ICT
NetCrossing 2
AMA Bank
Solar Entertainment Corporation
Nine Media Corporation
CNN Philippines

Transportation

Transport terminals 
 Parklea Jeepney Terminal
 Starmall Shaw Jeepney Terminal
 Starmall Shaw UV Express Terminal

Bus routes 
   Kalentong - Pasig

Jeepney Routes 
 Pasig - Quiapo (T205)
 EDSA/Shaw - Morong (T256)
 EDSA/Shaw - Tanay (T257)
 EDSA/Shaw - Binangonan (T258)
 EDSA/Shaw - Pasig (T295)
 EDSA/Shaw - Taytay (T297)
 EDSA/Shaw - Antipolo (T298)
 EDSA/Shaw - Kalentong/JRU (T347)

UV Express Routes 
 Pasig - Quiapo (N63)
 Quiapo - SM Megamall (N65)
 Binangonan - Starmall Shaw (N72)
 Taytay - Starmall Shaw (N74)

Railways 
 MRT-3 Shaw Boulevard Station

Intersections

References

Streets in Metro Manila
Boulevards